The witch-hazel cone gall aphid (Hormaphis hamamelidis) is a minuscule insect, a member of the aphid superfamily, whose presence on a witch-hazel plant is easily recognizable by a conical gall structure. The gall is green at first, then turns bright red.  This gall, rich in nutrients, provides both food and shelter for the female aphid. The host plant is witchhazel (Hamamelis virginiana). At lower altitudes they have a secondary host: river birch (Betula nigra), but this may be a different species.

At the start of spring, females or stem mothers crawl to leaf buds. As the leaf grows, the aphid injects it with a substance, possibly an enzyme or hormone, that causes that the galls to form around her. Once inside her gall the stem mother reproduces asexually and fills the gall with 50-70 female offspring. The second generation develops wings and disperses, repeating the process. The third generation includes both males and females. Towards the end of summer, the third generation reproduces sexually and lays eggs on the branches of the witch-hazel. The following spring the cycle begins anew. This cycle allows the aphid to increase its population dramatically in a relatively short period of time.

References

External links
"Biting the Plant that Feeds You"
Article on gall-forming aphids
Species Hormaphis hamamelidis - Witch Hazel Cone Gall Aphid

Hormaphidinae
Insects described in 1851
Taxa named by Asa Fitch
Hemiptera of North America
Gall-inducing insects